The 1930–31 Eintracht Frankfurt season was the 31st season in the club's football history. In 1930–31 the club played in the Bezirksliga Main-Hessen (Main division), then one of many top tiers of German football. It was the club's 4th season in the Bezirksliga Main-Hessen (Main division).

The season ended up with Eintracht finishing the South German championship as runners-up, but later losing to Hamburger SV in the quarter-final in the run for the German championship knockout stage.

Matches

Legend

Friendlies

Bezirksliga Main-Hessen (Main division)

League fixtures and results

League table

Results summary

Results by round

South German Championship round

League fixtures and results

League table

Results summary

Results by round

German Championship knockout stage

Squad

Squad and statistics

|}

Transfers

In:

Out:

See also
 1931 German football championship

Notes

Sources

External links
 Official English Eintracht website 
 German archive site

1930-31
German football clubs 1930–31 season